Hebius sarawacensis, also known as the Sarawak keelback, is a species of snake of the family Colubridae. The snake is found in Borneo (Sabah and Sarawak, Malaysia; Brunei; Kalimantan, Indonesia) and in southern Malay Peninsula.

References 

sarawacensis
Snakes of Southeast Asia
Reptiles of Brunei
Reptiles of Indonesia
Reptiles of Malaysia
Reptiles of Borneo
Reptiles of the Malay Peninsula
Reptiles described in 1872
Taxa named by Albert Günther